Soray is a  mountain in the Vilcabamba Range in the Andes of Peru. It is located in the province of Anta, in the region of Cusco.

External links 
 Cerro Soray. Summitpost Page.

References 

Mountains of Peru
Mountains of Cusco Region